Padrauna Lok Sabha constituency was a Lok Sabha (parliamentary) constituency in Uttar Pradesh state in northern India till 2008.

Assembly segments
Padrauna Lok Sabha constituency had the following five Vidhan Sabha (legislative assembly) constituencies:
 Naurangia
 Ramkola
 Hata
 Padrauna
 Seorahi

Members of Parliament

See also
 Kushi Nagar Lok Sabha constituency
 List of former constituencies of the Lok Sabha

Notes

Former Lok Sabha constituencies of Uttar Pradesh
2008 disestablishments in India
Constituencies disestablished in 2008
Kushinagar district
Former constituencies of the Lok Sabha